Benajah Harvey Carroll, known as B. H. Carroll (December 27, 1843 – November 11, 1914), was a Baptist pastor, theologian, teacher, and author.

Biography
Carroll was born near Carrollton in Carroll County in north central Mississippi, one of twelve children  to Benajah Carroll and the former Mary Eliza Mallard. His father was a Baptist minister. The family moved to Burleson County, Texas in 1858.

Carroll served in the army of the Confederate States of America from 1862 to 1864. In 1865, at the age of twenty two, he converted to Christianity at a Methodist camp meeting after taking up a preacher's challenge to experiment with Christianity. In 1866, he took as a second wife the former Ellen Virginia Bell. The first wife was divorced for her infidelity while Carroll was at war. After her death, he married the former Hallie Harrison in 1899.

Carroll was a denominational leader both in the Baptist General Convention of Texas (of which he was a leading founder) and the Southern Baptist Convention. Much of his rise to prominence developed through proving himself a formidable foe in controversy - including debates with Texas politicians, standing for board policies and convention authority in the Hayden controversy in the Baptist General Convention, and opposing the president of Southern Seminary during the Whitsitt controversy at Southern Baptist Theological Seminary. While Carroll had Landmark tendencies, he was not the champion of the Landmark Movement some have made him to be. Of the four major controversies involving Landmark ideas, Carroll sided against the Landmarkers in three of the four. Only in the Whitsitt controversy did Carroll side with Landmarkers and, for Carroll, that controversy was about trustee authority, not Landmark beliefs.

Carroll's theology can best be described as moderately Calvinistic, postmillennial, and thoroughly Baptist. His postmillennialism was associated with neither the social engineering of Walter Rauschenbusch, nor the expectation that every soul in every community would be converted. Instead, Carroll held such a strong confidence in the work of the Holy Spirit, Christ's Vicar, that churches who accepted their role as God's instruments on earth would not ultimately fail in the Holy Spirit's mission to bring about the conversion of the vast majority of humanity, at which time Christ would return to fully institute His kingdom on earth. Carroll vehemently attacked Roman Catholicism for the papal claim that usurped the Holy Spirit's role as Christ's representative, dispensational premillennialism for their pessimism about the success of the Holy Spirit and the success of churches, the Restoration Movement for their reliance on human apprehension and denial of direct revelation, and modernism for the over-reliance on scientific method to the exclusion of Divine revelation and historical evidence. He led in founding the Southwestern Baptist Theological Seminary in Fort Worth, Texas in 1908, which moved from Waco to Fort Worth in 1910. He served as president of the seminary until his death.

Carroll's younger brother, James Milton Carroll, was also an important Baptist leader in Texas.  His son, B.H. Carroll Jr., would later become Tarrant County school superintendent and the namesake of the Carroll Independent School District in Southlake, Texas.

Carroll published 33 volumes of works, and is best known for his 17-volume commentary, An Interpretation of the English Bible. Benajah Harvey Carroll died November 11, 1914, and is buried at the Oakwood Cemetery in Waco, Texas.

Southern Baptist conservative resurgence

While Carroll was known for his expositional preaching and had agreed with the first article of the New Hampshire confession of faith, which said that the Scriptures contained "truth without any mixture of error for its matter," the doctrine of Scripture was not the most notable tenet of Carroll's theology and work. His work on the subject, inspiration of Scripture, was compiled and published posthumously by J. B. Cranfill in 1930. Beginning in the late-sixties and having its height in the late-seventies and early- to mid-eighties, the conservative resurgence looked toward Carroll as a foundation for their own arguments and as an example of the historic Southern Baptist position on the inerrancy of Scripture.

Harold Lindsell extensively outlined Carroll's position in one of his works. Lindsell also stated, "This volume [Inspiration] should be republished today and read by tens of thousands of Baptists so that they would better understand the theological roots from which they have sprung." The year after Lindsell published those words, Thomas Nelson reprinted Inspiration, including two additional prefaces. One was by Paige Patterson, a leader in the resurgence and future successor to Carroll as president of Southwestern.

The other preface was by W. A. Criswell, who in that preface saw the reprint as "timely," and coming at "a crucial time in our history." Criswell had earlier served as a catalyst for the resurgence in his publication, Why I Preach that the Bible Is Literally True, in which Criswell had referred to Carroll. Other members of the conservative resurgence also included Carroll in their defenses of the inerrancy of Scripture.

The historian Joseph E. Early, Jr., assistant professor of theology at Campbellsville University in Campbellsville, Kentucky, maintains that Carroll had an overbearing, even "bullying", tendency and rarely failed to gain his way in matters of Baptist faith and practice. For instance, Carroll worked through the trustees to obtain the separation and removal of the seminary from Waco to Fort Worth in 1908, while Baylor president Samuel Palmer Brooks was away from the campus. He constantly quarreled with the editors of the Texas Baptist Herald even though the denominational newspaper published his sermons. He did not hesitate to remove erring churches from the denomination.

Prominent students
 Walter Thomas Conner

See also
Southwestern Baptist Theological Seminary
B. H. Carroll Theological Institute
List of Baptists
List of preachers

Notes

References
 Carroll, B.H. Interpretation of the English Bible.17 vols. Edited by J.B. Cranfill. Nashville: Broadman Press, 1947.
 Carroll, B.H. Biblical Addresses, and Educational and Religious Addresses. Edited and compiled by J.W. Crowder. N.p.:n.p., n.d. Held in the B.H. Carroll Collection. J.T. and Zelma Luther Rare Books and Special Collection of Roberts Library, Southwestern Baptist Theological Seminary, Fort Worth, Texas.
 Encyclopedia of Southern Baptists, Vol. 1. Nashville, Tennessee: Broadman, 1958.
 Early, Joseph E. Jr. A Texas Baptist Power Struggle: The Hayden Controversy. Dallas: University of North Texas Press, 2005.;
 George, Timothy and David S. Dockery eds. Theologians of the Baptist Tradition. Nashville, Tennessee: Broadman & Holman, 2001.
 Jonas, Glenn. "The Political Side of B. H. Carroll." Baptist History and Heritage 33, no. 3 (Autumn 1998), 49-56.
 Lefever, Alan J. Fighting the Good Fight: The Life and Work of B. H. Carroll. Austin, Texas: Eakin, 1994.
 Macklin, George Benjamin. "Pneumatology: A Unifying Theme in B. H. Carroll’s Theology." PhD diss., Southwestern Baptist Theological Seminary, 2007.
 McDaniel, George W. A Memorial Wreath: World War Martyrs, Lee's Veterans, B. H. Carroll, J. B. Gambrell. Dallas: Baptist Standard, 1921.

1843 births
1914 deaths
American Baptist theologians
People from Burleson County, Texas
Southern Baptist ministers
Converts to Christianity
Seminary presidents
Southwestern Baptist Theological Seminary faculty
University and college founders
People from Carroll County, Mississippi
Confederate States Army personnel
Southern Baptists
Baptists from Mississippi